The Women's giant slalom competition of the Nagano 1998 Olympics was held at Shiga Kogen.

The defending world champion was Deborah Compagnoni of Italy, who was also the defending World Cup giant slalom champion.

Results

References 

Women's giant slalom
Olymp
Women's events at the 1998 Winter Olympics